Pouldouran is a former commune in the Côtes-d'Armor department of Brittany in northwestern France. On 1 January 2019, it was merged into the new commune La Roche-Jaudy.

Population

Inhabitants of Pouldouran are called pouldourannais in French.

Breton language
The municipality launched a linguistic plan through Ya d'ar brezhoneg on 25 November 2005.

See also
Communes of the Côtes-d'Armor department

References

Former communes of Côtes-d'Armor